Allantus cinctus, known generally as the curled rose sawfly or banded rose sawfly, is a species of common sawfly in the family Tenthredinidae. It is found in Europe.

References

External links

 

Tenthredinidae
Articles created by Qbugbot
Taxa named by Carl Linnaeus